Marko Dugandžić (born 7 April 1994) is a Croatian professional footballer who plays as a striker for Liga I club Rapid București.

Club career
His good performances for Osijek attracted many European teams, such as Fiorentina, Blackburn Rovers and Leeds United. Instead, he signed for Serie B Ternana in January 2015.

On 14 October 2020, he joined Russian Premier League club PFC Sochi.

On 11 January 2022, he returned to Romania and signed with CFR Cluj.

Career statistics

Club

Honours

CFR Cluj
Liga I: 2021–22
Supercupa României runner-up: 2022

References

External links

Marko Dugandžić at Sportnet.hr 

1994 births
Living people
Footballers from Osijek
Association football forwards
Croatian footballers
Croatia youth international footballers
Croatia under-21 international footballers
NK Osijek players
Ternana Calcio players
Matera Calcio players
FC Botoșani players
PFC Sochi players
CFR Cluj players
FC Rapid București players
Croatian Football League players
First Football League (Croatia) players
Serie B players
Serie C players
Liga I players
Russian Premier League players
Croatian expatriate footballers
Croatian expatriate sportspeople in Italy
Expatriate footballers in Italy
Croatian expatriate sportspeople in Romania
Expatriate footballers in Romania
Croatian expatriate sportspeople in Russia
Expatriate footballers in Russia